Ezeiza Partido is a partido (second-level administrative subdivision) located in the southern part of Gran Buenos Aires in Buenos Aires Province, Argentina.

Ezeiza and its surroundings is an affluent area where many well-to-do people live. There are many gated communities in Ezeiza.

Sports
This provincial subdivision is home to Club Social y Deportivo Tristán Suárez, a football club that play in the regionalised 3rd tier of Argentine football, Primera B Metropolitana.

Districts

Ezeiza
Tristán Suárez
La Unión
Carlos Spegazzini
Ezeiza International Airport
Canning

References

External links

 

 
1994 establishments in Argentina
Partidos of Buenos Aires Province